Voronoi or Voronoy is a Slavic masculine surname; its feminine counterpart is Voronaya. It may refer to
Georgy Voronoy (1868–1908), Russian and Ukrainian mathematician
Voronoi diagram
Weighted Voronoi diagram
Voronoi deformation density
Voronoi formula
Voronoi pole
Centroidal Voronoi tessellation